Autumn and Spring (Spanish: Otoño y primavera) is a 1949 Mexican drama film directed by Adolfo Fernández Bustamante.

The film's sets were designed by Ramón Rodríguez Granada.

Cast
 Perla Aguiar
 Irma Bonola
 Eva Calvo 
 Milagros Carrillo
 Micaela Castejón 
 Prudencia Grifell 
 Luis Alfonso Lavalle
 Rita Macedo 
 Paco Martinez
 Pablo Mendizábal
 José Luis Menéndez
 Lina Montes
 Carmen Novelty
 Elvia Pedroza 
 Óscar Pulido 
 Josette Simo
 Emilio Tuero

References

Bibliography 
 Román Gubern. El Cine Español en el Exilio. Lumen, 1976.

External links 
 

1949 films
1949 drama films
Mexican drama films
1940s Spanish-language films
Films directed by Adolfo Fernández Bustamante
Mexican black-and-white films
1940s Mexican films